R v Big M Drug Mart Ltd (Her Majesty The Queen in Right of Canada v Big M Drug Mart Ltd) is a landmark decision by Supreme Court of Canada where the Court struck down the federal Lord's Day Act for violating section 2 of the Canadian Charter of Rights and Freedoms. This case had many firsts in constitutional law including being the first to interpret section 2.

Background 
On Sunday, May 30, 1982, the Calgary store Big M Drug Mart was charged with unlawfully carrying on the sale of goods on a Sunday contrary to the Lord's Day Act of 1906.  At trial the store was acquitted, and an appeal was dismissed by the Alberta Court of Appeal.

The constitutional question put before the Court was whether the Act infringed the right to freedom of conscience and religion,  if so, whether it is justified under section 1 of the Charter, and whether the Act was intra vires ("within") Parliament's criminal power under section 91(27) of the Constitution Act, 1867.

Ruling 
The Supreme Court ruled that the statute was an unconstitutional violation of section 2 of the Canadian Charter of Rights and Freedoms, deciding that there was no true secular basis for the legislation and its only purpose was, in effect, to establish a state religious-based requirement, and was therefore invalid. The drug store's victory was made possible by section 52 of the Constitution Act, 1982, which provides that unconstitutional laws can be found invalid, as opposed to section 24 of the Charter, which is for those whose rights are violated. In as much as a corporation is not a natural person, it cannot have a religion and therefore the corporation'''s religious freedom was not violated.

In that case, Chief Justice Brian Dickson wrote that this freedom at least includes freedom of religious speech, including "the right to entertain such religious beliefs as a person chooses, the right to declare religious beliefs openly and without fear of hindrance or reprisal, and the right to manifest religious belief by worship and practice or by teaching and dissemination." Freedom of religion would also prohibit imposing religious requirements.

The Lord's Day Act was the first law in Charter jurisprudence to be struck down in its entirety, and some of the section 1 analysis in the decision played a role in developing the "Oakes test" in the later case R v Oakes.

Footnotes

See also
 List of Supreme Court of Canada cases (Dickson Court)R v Edwards Books and Art Ltd (1986) - later Sunday closing law decision
 McGowan v. Maryland'' (1961) - Contrary U.S Supreme Court decision on blue laws, holding that laws originally passed for religious reasons may nonetheless be constitutional if they can be shown to fulfill a secular purpose

External links

Big M Drug Mart Ltd.
Big M Drug Mart Ltd.
Big M Drug Mart Ltd.
Big M Drug Mart Ltd.
Sunday shopping
History of Calgary